Carmelo Barone (born 3 April 1956) is an Italian former cyclist. Barone competed in the individual road race and team time trial events at the 1976 Summer Olympics.

References

External links
 

1956 births
Living people
Italian male cyclists
Olympic cyclists of Italy
Cyclists at the 1976 Summer Olympics
People from Avola
Sportspeople from the Province of Syracuse
Cyclists from Sicily